The Grand Prix of Boston was a proposed IndyCar Series race scheduled to be first held on September 4, 2016. The race was to have taken place on a 2.25 mile route along the South Boston Seaport. The city of Boston, Massachusetts Department of Transportation, Massachusetts Bay Transportation Authority, and the Massachusetts Convention Center Authority had reached an agreement with Indycar to allow the race to move forward.  However, it was ultimately decided that the race would be cancelled at its originally planned venue; moving it to another Boston-area location was considered before the event was cancelled completely.

Alongside the IndyCar Series, the weekend was also scheduled to have races from the Indy Lights, Stadium Super Trucks, and IMSA Super Trofeo series.

The event was replaced on the 2016 IndyCar Series schedule by a race at Watkins Glen.

After the cancellation, the CEO of the Boston Grand Prix, John F. Casey, appeared in U.S. Bankruptcy Court to account for the project's funds. In 2021, Casey, who had also served as chief financial officer of the Boston Grand Prix, pleaded guilty to multiple counts of wire fraud, aggravated identity theft, money laundering, and filing false tax returns.

References

External links
Official site
Coalition Against IndyCar Boston
Friends of IndyCar Boston 

IndyCar Series races